Adrian is a form of the Latin given name Adrianus or Hadrianus. Its ultimate origin is most likely via the former river Adria from the Venetic and Illyrian word adur, meaning "sea" or "water".

The Adria was until the 8th century BC the main channel of the Po River into the Adriatic Sea but ceased to exist before the 1st century BC. Hecataeus of Miletus (c.550 – c.476 BC) asserted that both the Etruscan harbor city of Adria and the Adriatic Sea had been named after it. Emperor Hadrian's family was named after the city or region of Adria/Hadria, now Atri, in Picenum, which most likely started as an Etruscan or Greek colony of the older harbor city of the same name. 

Several saints and six popes have borne this name, including the only English pope, Adrian IV, and the only Dutch pope, Adrian VI. As an English name, it has been in use since the Middle Ages, although it did not become common until modern times.

Religion
Pope Adrian I (c. 700–795)
Pope Adrian II (792–872)
Pope Adrian III (died 885)
Pope Adrian IV (c. 1100–1159), English pope
Pope Adrian V (c. 1205–1276)
Adrian of Batanea (died 308), Christian martyr and saint
Adrian of Canterbury (died 710), scholar and Abbot of St Augustine's Abbey in Canterbury
Adrian of Castello (1460–1521), Italian cardinal and writer
Adrian of May (died 875), Scottish saint from the Isle of May, martyred by Vikings
Adrian of Moscow (1627–1700), last pre-revolutionary Patriarch of Moscow and All Russia
Adrian of Nicomedia (died 306), martyr and Herculian Guard of the Roman Emperor Galerius Maximian
Adrian of Ondrusov (died 1549), Russian Orthodox saint and wonder-worker
Adrian of Poshekhonye (died 1550), Russian Orthodox saint, hegumen of Dormition monastery in Yaroslavl region
Adrian of Transylvania (fl. 1183–1201), Hungarian bishop and chancellor
Adrian Fortescue (martyr) (1476–1539), English courtier at Henry VIII's court, beatified as a Roman Catholic martyr
Adrian Gouffier de Boissy (1479–1523), French Roman Catholic bishop and cardinal
Adrian Kivumbi Ddungu (1923–2009), Ugandan Roman Catholic bishop
Adrian Leo Doyle (born 1936), Australian prelate of the Roman Catholic Church

Government and politics
Adrian Amstutz (born 1953), Swiss politician
Adrian Arnold (1932–2018), American politician
Adrian Bailey (born 1945), British politician
Adrian Baillie (1898–1947), British politician
Adrian A. Basora (born 1938), American diplomat
Adrian Benepe, American Commissioner
Adrian Bennett (1933–2006), Australian politician
Adrian Benjamin Bentzon (1777–1827), Norwegian politician
Adrian Berry, 4th Viscount Camrose (1937–2016), British hereditary peer and journalist
Adrian P. Burke (1904–2000), American judge and politician
Adrián Fernández Cabrera (born 1967), Mexican politician
Adrian Cochrane-Watson (born 1967), Irish politician
Adrian Davis (civil servant), British economist and civil servant
Adrian Delia (born 1969), Maltese politician
Adrian Fenty (born 1970), American politician, mayor of Washington D.C.
Adrian Flook (born 1963), British politician
Adrian Foster (politician), Canadian politician
Adrian Hasler (born 1964), Liechtenstein politician
Adrian Knatchbull-Hugessen (1891–1976), Canadian lawyer and senator
Adrián Vázquez Lázara (born 1982), Spanish politician
Adrian Molin (1880–1942), Swedish writer and political activist
Adrian Năstase (born 1950), Romanian politician
Adrian Neritani, former Permanent Representative of Albania to the United Nations
Adrián Rivera Pérez (born 1962), Mexican politician
Adrian Piccoli (born 1970), Australian politician
Adrian von Renteln (1897–1946), Nazi commander in Lithuania
Adrian Cola Rienzi (1905–1972), Trinidadin and Tobagonian trade unionist, civil rights activist, politician, and lawyer
Adriano Sánchez Roa (born 1956), Dominican politician
Adrian Rurawhe (born 1961), New Zealand politician
Adrian M. Smith (born 1970), American politician
Adrian Sanders (born 1959), British politician
Adrian Severin (born 1954), Romanian politician and Member of the European Parliament
Adrian Smith (politician) (born 1970), American politician
Adrian Stokes (courtier) (1519–1586), English politician
Adrian Stoughton (1556–1614), English politician

Academia
Adrian Albert  (1905–1972), American mathematician 
Adrian Baddeley (born 1955), Australian scientist
Adrian Bailey (academic), American scholar
Adrian Bejan (born 1948), Romanian-born professor of mechanical engineering at Duke University
Adrian Beverland (1650–1716), Dutch philosopher and jurist who settled in England
Adrian Bird (born 1947), British geneticist
Adrian Bowyer (born 1952), engineer, creator of the RepRap project
Adrian John Brown (1852–1919), British professor and pioneer
Adrian David Cheok (born 1971/1972), Australian electrical engineer and professor
Adrian Curaj (born 1958), Romanian engineer
Adrian Darby (born 1937), British conservationist and academic
Adrian Goldsworthy (born 1969), British historian and author who writes mostly about ancient Roman history
Adrian Hardy Haworth (1767–1833), English entomologist, botanist and carcinologist
Adrian Ioana (born 1981), Romanian mathematician
Adrian Mihai Ionescu, Romanian professor
Adrian Ioviță (born 1954), Romanian-Canadian mathematician
Adrian Jacobsen (1853–1947), Norwegian ethnologist and explorer 
Adrian Kaehler, American scientist, engineer, entrepreneur, inventor, and author
Adrian Liston (born 1980), British immunologist and author
Adrian Paterson, South African scientist and engineer
Adrián Recinos (1886–1962), Guatemalan historian, Mayanist and diplomat
Adrian Smith (born 1946), British statistician
Adrian Stephens (1795–1876), English engineer, inventor of the steam whistle
Adrian V. Stokes (1945–2020), British computer scientist
Adrian Webb (born 1943), British academic and public administrator
Adrian Zenz (born 1974), German anthropologist

Military
Adrian Becher (1897–1957), British Army officer and cricketer
Adrian von Bubenberg (1434–1479), Bernese knight, military commander and mayor
Adrian Carton de Wiart (1880–1963), Belgian-born British Army lieutenant-general awarded the Victoria Cross
Adrian Cole (RAAF officer) (1895–1966), Australian World War I flying ace
Adrian Johns (born 1951), English governor of Gibraltar and former Royal Navy vice-admiral
Adrian Dietrich Lothar von Trotha (1848–1920), German military commander in Africa
Adrian Marks (1917–1998), United States Navy pilot
Adrian Consett Stephen (1894–1918), Australian artillery officer and playwright
Adrian Warburton (1918–1944), British Second World War pilot
Adrián Woll (1795–1875), French Mexican general during the Texas Revolution and the Mexican–American War

Sports

American football 
 Adrian Amos (born 1993), American football player
 Adrian Arrington (born 1985), American football player
 Adrian Awasom (born 1983), Cameroon-born American football player
 Adrian Baird (born 1979), Canadian football player
 Adrian Baril (1898–1961), American football player
 Adrian Battles (born 1987), American football player
 Adrian Breen (quarterback) (born 1965), American football player
 Adrian Burk (1927–2003), American football player
 Adrian Clarke (born 1991), Canadian football player
 Adrian Clayborn (born 1988), American football player
 Adrian Colbert (born 1993), American football player
 Adrian Cooper (born 1968), American football player
 Adrian Davis (Canadian football) (born 1981), Canadian football player
 A. J. Davis (cornerback, born 1983), American football player known as A.J. Davis
 Adrian Dingle (American football) (born 1977), American football player
 Adrian Ealy (born 1999), American football player
 Adrian Ford (1904–1977), American football player
 Adrian Grady (born 1985), American football player
 Adrian Hamilton (born 1987), American football player
 Adrian Hardy (born 1970), American football player
 Adrian Hubbard (born 1992), American football player
 Adrian Jones (American football) (born 1981), American football player
 Adrian Killins (born 1998), American football player
 Adrian Klemm (born 1977), American football player and coach
 Adrian Madise (born 1980), American football player
 Adrian Magee (born 1996), American football player
 Adrian Martinez (American football) (born 2000), American football player
 Adrian Mayes (born 1980), American football player
 Adrian Moten (born 1988), American football player
 Adrian Murrell (born 1970), American football player
 Adrian Peterson (American football, born 1979), American football player
 Adrian Peterson (born 1985), American football player
 Adrian Phillips (born 1992), American football player
 Adrian Robinson (1989–2015), American football player
 Adrian Ross (born 1975), American football player
 Adrian Tracy (born 1988), American football player
 Adrian White (American football) (born 1964), American football player
 Adrian Wilson (American football) (born 1979), American football player
 Adrian Young (American football) (born 1949), American football player

Association football 
 Adrián Aldrete (born 1988), Mexican footballer
 Adrian Aliaj (born 1976), Albanian footballer
 Adrian Allenspach (born 1969), Swiss footballer
 Adrian Alston (born 1949), English footballer
 Adrián Álvarez (born 1968), Argentine footballer
 Adrian Anca (born 1976), Romanian footballer
 Adrian Antunović (born 1989), Croatian footballer
 Adrián Argachá (born 1986), Uruguayan footballer
 Adrian García Arias (born 1975), Mexican footballer
 Adrián Arregui (born 1992), Argentine footballer
 Adrián Ascues (born 2002), Peruvian footballer
 Adrian Ávalos (born 1974), Argentine footballer
 Adrian Avrămia (born 1992), Romanian footballer
 Adrian Bajrami (born 2002), Swiss footballer
 Adrian Bakalli (born 1976), Belgian footballer
 Adrian Bălan (born 1990), Romanian footballer
 Adrián Balboa (born 1994), Uruguayan footballer
 Adrian Baldovin (born 1971), Romanian footballer
 Adrian Barbullushi (born 1968), Albanian footballer
 Adrian Bartkowiak (born 1987), Polish footballer
 Adrian Basta (born 1988), Polish footballer
 Adrián Bastía (born 1978), Argentine footballer
 Adrian Beck (born 1997), German footballer
 Adrian Benedyczak (born 2000), Polish footballer
 Adrián Berbia (born 1977), Uruguayan goalkeeper
 Adrián Bernabé (born 2001), Spanish footballer
 Adrian Bevington (born c. 1971), Club England Managing Director
 Adrian Bielawski (born 1996), Polish footballer
 Adrian Billhardt (born 1997), German footballer
 Adrian Bird (born 1969), English footballer
 Adrian Błąd (born 1991), Polish footballer
 Adrian Blake (born 2005), English footballer
 Adrian Bogoi (born 1973), Romanian footballer
 Adrián Bone (born 1988), Ecuadorian footballer
 Adrian Boothroyd (born 1971), English footballer and manager
 Adrian Borza (born 1985), Romanian footballer
 Adrian Budka (born 1980), Polish footballer
 Adrian Bumbescu (born 1960), Romanian footballer
 Adrian Bumbut (born 1984), Romanian footballer
 Adrian Butters (born 1988), Canadian footballer
 Adrián Butzke (born 1999), Spanish footballer
 Adrian Caceres (born 1982), Argentine footballer
 Adrián Calello (born 1987), Argentine footballer
 Adrián Cañas (born 1992), Spanish footballer
 Adrian Cann (born 1980), Canadian soccer player
 Adrian Cașcaval (born 1987), Moldovan footballer
 Adrián Centurión (born 1993), Argentine footballer
 Adrián Čermák (born 1993), Slovak footballer
 Adrian Chama (born 1989), Zambian footballer
 Adrián Chávez (born 1962), Mexican footballer
 Adrian Chomiuk (born 1988), Polish footballer
 Adrián Chovan (born 1995), Slovak footballer
 Adrian Cieślewicz (born 1990), Polish footballer
 Adrian Clarke (footballer) (born 1974), English footballer
 Adrian Clifton (born 1988), English footballer
 Adrián Colombino (born 1993), Uruguayan footballer
 Adrián Colunga (born 1984), Spanish footballer
 Adrian Coote (born 1978), English footballer
 Adrián Cortés (born 1983), Mexican footballer
 Adrian Cristea (born 1983), Romanian footballer
 Adrián Cruz (born 1987), Spanish footballer
 Adrián Cuadra (born 1997), Chilean footballer
 Adrian Cuciula (born 1986), Romanian footballer
 Adrian Cucovei (born 1982), Moldovan footballer
 Adrian Dabasse (born 1993), French footballer
 Adrián Dalmau (born 1994), Spanish footballer
 Adrian Danek (born 1994), Polish footballer
 Adrián Diéguez (born 1996), Spanish footballer
 Adrian Drida (born 1982), Romanian footballer
 Adrian Dubois (born 1987), American footballer
 Adrian Dulcea (born 1978), Romanian footballer and manager
 Adrian Durrer (born 2001), Swiss footballer
 Adrian Edqvist (born 1999), Swedish footballer
 Adrián El Charani (born 2000), Venezuelan footballer
 Adrian Elrick (born 1949), New Zealand footballer
 Adrián Escudero (1927–2011), Spanish footballer
 Adrián Faúndez (born 1989), Chilean footballer
 Adrian Fein (born 1999), German footballer
 Adrián Fernández (footballer, born 1980), Argentine footballer
 Adrián Fernández (footballer, born 1992), Paraguayan footballer
 Adrian Foncette (born 1988), Trinidadian footballer
 Adrian Forbes (born 1979), English footballer
 Adrian Foster (footballer) (born 1971), English footballer and manager
 Adrián Fuentes (born 1996), Spanish footballer
 Adrián Gabbarini (born 1985), Argentine footballer
 Adrian Dan Găman (born 1978), Romanian footballer
 Adrian Gheorghiu (born 1981), Romanian footballer
 Adrian Gîdea (born 2000), Romanian footballer
 Adrián González (footballer, born 1976), Argentine footballer
 Adrián González (footballer, born 1988), Spanish footballer
 Adrián González (footballer, born 1995), Argentine footballer
 Adrián González (footballer, born 2003), Mexican footballer
 Adrián Hernán González (born 1976), Argentine footballer
 Adrián González Morales (born 1988), Spanish footballer
 Adrián Goransch (born 1999), Mexican footballer
 Adrian Grbić (born 1996), Austrian footballer
 Adrian Grigoruță (born 1983), Romanian footballer
 Adrian Gryszkiewicz (born 1999), Polish footballer
 Adrián Gunino (born 1989), Uruguayan footballer
 Adrian Hajdari (born 2000), Macedonian footballer
 Adrian Aleksander Hansen (born 2001), Norwegian footballer
 Adrian Heath (born 1961), English footballer and manager
 Adrian Henger (born 1996), Polish footballer
 Adrián José Hernández (born 1983), Spanish footballer, known as Pollo
 Adrián Horváth (born 1987), Hungarian footballer
 Adrian Iencsi (born 1975), Romanian footballer and manager
 Adrian Ilie (born 1974), Romanian footballer
 Adrian Ilie (footballer, born 1981), Romanian footballer
 Adrian Ionescu (footballer, born 1958), Romanian footballer
 Adrian Ionescu (footballer, born 1985), Romanian footballer
 Adrian Ioniță (born 2000), Romanian footballer
 Adrian Iordache (born 1980), Romanian footballer
 Adrian Dragoș Iordache (born 1981), Romanian footballer
 Adrian Jevrić (born 1986), German footballer
 Adrián Jusino (born 1992), Bolivian footballer
 Adrian Kappenberger (born 1996), Danish footballer
 Adrian Kasztelan (born 1986), Polish footballer
 Adrian Klepczyński (born 1981), Polish footballer
 Adrian Klimczak (born 1997), Polish footballer
 Adrian Knup (born 1968), Swiss footballer
 Adrián Kocsis (born 1991), Hungarian footballer
 Adrian Kunz (born 1967), Swiss footballer
 Adrián Lapeña (born 1996), Spanish footballer
 Adrián Torres Lázaro (born 1998), Spanish footballer commonly known as Lele
 Adrian Leijer (born 1986), Australian footballer
 Adrián Leites (born 1992), Uruguayan footballer
 Adrian LeRoy (born 1987), Canadian footballer
 Adrián Leško (born 1995), Slovak footballer
 Adrian Liber (born 2001), Croatian footballer
 Adrian Lis (born 1992), Polish footballer
 Adrian Littlejohn (born 1970), English footballer
 Adrián Lois (born 1989), Spanish footballer
 Adrián López (footballer, born 1987), Spanish footballer
 Adrián López (born 1988), Spanish footballer
 Adrián Lozano (born 1999), Mexican footballer
 Adrian Lucaci (1966–2020), Romanian footballer
 Adrián Lucero (born 1985), Argentine footballer
 Adrián Marín Lugo (born 1994), Mexican footballer
 Adrián Luna (born 1992), Uruguayan footballer
 Adrian Łyszczarz (born 1999), Polish footballer
 Adrian Madaschi (born 1982), Australian footballer
 Adrian Małachowski (born 1998), Polish footballer
 Adrian Marek (born 1987), Polish footballer
 Adrian Mariappa (born 1986), English footballer
 Adrián Marín (footballer, born 1994), Mexican footballer
 Adrián Marín (footballer, born 1997), Spanish footballer
 Adrian Mărkuș (born 1992), Romanian footballer
 Adrián Martín (footballer) (born 1982), Spanish footballer
 Adrián Martínez (Mexican footballer) (born 1970)
 Adrián Martínez (Venezuelan footballer) (born 1993)
 Adrián Emmanuel Martínez (born 1992), Argentine footballer
 Adrián Nahuel Martínez (born 1992), Argentine footballer
 Adrian Matei (footballer) (born 1968), Romanian footballer
 Adrian Mierzejewski (born 1986), Polish footballer
 Adrian Mihalcea (born 1976), Romanian footballer
 Adrian Moescu (born 2001), Romanian footballer
 Adrián Mouriño (born 1988), Spanish footballer
 Adrian Mrowiec (born 1983), Polish footballer
 Adrian Mutu (born 1979), Romanian footballer
 Adrian Nalați (born 1983), Romanian footballer
 Adrian Napierała (born 1982), Polish footballer
 Adrian Neaga (born 1979), Romanian footballer
 Adrian Negrău (born 1968), Romanian footballer
 Adrian Neniță (born 1996), Romanian footballer
 Adrian Nikçi (born 1989), Swiss footballer
 Adrian Romeo Niță (born 2003), Romania footballer
 Adrian Olah (born 1981), Romania footballer
 Adrian Olegov (born 1985), Bulgarian footballer
 Adrian Olszewski (born 1993), Polish footballer
 Adrián Ortolá (born 1993), Spanish footballer
 Adrian Paluchowski (born 1987), Polish footballer
 Adrian Pătraș (born 1984), Moldovan footballer
 Adrian Pătulea (born 1984), Romanian footballer
 Adrián Paz (born 1966), Uruguayan footballer
 Adrian Pelka (born 1981), German footballer
 Adrian Pennock (born 1971), English footballer
 Adrián Peralta (born 1982), Argentine footballer
 Adrian Pereira (born 1999), Norwegian footballer
 Adrian Petre (born 1998), Romanian footballer
 Adrian Pettigrew (born 1986), English footballer
 Adrian Pigulea (born 1968), Romanian footballer
 Adrian Piț (born 1983), Romanian footballer
 Adrian Pitu (born 1975), Romanian footballer
 Adrian Popa (footballer, born 1988), Romanian footballer
 Adrian Popa (footballer, born 1990), Romanian footballer
 Adrian Poparadu (born 1987), Romanian footballer
 Adrian Popescu (born 1960), Romanian footballer
 Adrian Popescu (footballer, born 1975), Romanian footballer
 Adrian Pukanych (born 1981), Ukrainian footballer
 Adrian Pulis (born 1979), Maltan footballer
 Adrian Purzycki (born 1997), Polish footballer
 Adrian Rakowski (born 1990), Polish footballer
 Adrián Ramos (born 1986), Colombian footballer
 Adrián Ricchiuti (born 1978), Argentine footballer
 Adrián Riera (born 1996), Spanish footballer
 Adrián Ripa (born 1985), Spanish footballer
 Adrian Rochet (born 1987), Israel footballer
 Adrián Rojas (born 1977), Chilean footballer
 Adrian Rolko (born 1978), Czech footballer
 Adrián Romero (Argentine footballer) (born 1975)
 Adrián Romero (Uruguayan footballer) (born 1977)
 Adrian Ropotan (born 1986), Romanian footballer
 Adrián Ruelas (born 1991), American soccer player
 Adrian Rus (born 1996), Romanian footballer
 Adrian Rusu (born 1984), Romanian footballer
 Adrián Sahibeddine (born 1994), French footballer
 Adrian Sălăgeanu (born 1983), Romanian footballer
 Adrián Sánchez (born 1999), Argentine footballer
 Adrián San Miguel del Castillo (born 1987), Spanish football goalkeeper known as simply Adrián
 Adrián Sardinero (born 1990), Spanish footballer
 Adrian Sarkissian (born 1979), Uruguayan footballer
 Adrian Scarlatache (born 1986), Romanian footballer
 Adrian Schlagbauer (born 2002), German footballer
 Adrián Scifo (born 1987), Argentine footballer
 Adrian Šemper (born 1998), Croatian footballer
 Adrian Senin (born 1979), Romanian footballer
 Adrian Serioux (born 1979), Canadian soccer player
 Adrian Sikora (born 1980), Polish footballer
 Adrian Sosnovschi (born 1977), Moldovan footballer and manager
 Adrián Spörle (born 1995), Argentine footballer
 Adrian Spyrka (born 1967), German footballer
 Adrian Stanilewicz (born 2000), German footballer
 Adrian Șter (born 1998), Romanian footballer
 Adrian Stoian (born 1991), Romanian footballer
 Adrian Stoicov (1967–2017), Romanian footballer
 Adrian Șut (born 1999), Romanian footballer
 Adrian Świątek (born 1986), Polish footballer
 Adrián Szekeres (born 1989), Hungarian footballer
 Adrián Szőke (born 1998), Serbian footballer
 Adrian Toma (born 1976), Romanian footballer
 Adrián Torres (born 1989), Argentine footballer
 Adrian Trinidad (born 1982), Argentine footballer
 Adrián Turmo (born 2001), Spanish footballer
 Adrián Ugarriza (born 1997), Peruvian footballer
 Adrian Ursea (born 1967), Romanian footballer and manager
 Adrian Valentić (born 1987), Croatian footballer
 Adrian Vera (born 1997), American footballer
 Adrian Viciu (born 1991), Romanian footballer
 Adrian Viveash (born 1969), English footballer, better known as Adi Viveash 
 Adrian Vlas (born 1982), Romanian footballer
 Adrian Ionuț Voicu (born 1992), Romanian footballer
 Adrian Voiculeț (born 1985), Romanian footballer
 Adrian Webster (footballer, born 1951), English footballer
 Adrian Webster (footballer, born 1980), New Zealand footballer
 Adrian Whitbread (born 1971), English footballer and manager
 Adrian Williams, better known as Ady Williams (born 1971), English footballer and manager
 Adrian Winter (born 1986), Swiss footballer
 Adrian Woźniczka (born 1982), Polish footballer
 Adrian Zahra (born 1990), Australian footballer
 Adrian Zaluschi (born 1989), Romanian footballer
 Adrián Zambrano (born 2000), Venezuelan footballer
 Adrián Zela (born 1989), Peruvian footballer
 Adrian Zendejas (born 1995), American footballer
 Adrián Zermeño (born 1979), Mexican footballer

Baseball 

 Adrian Constantine Anson better known as Cap Anson (1852–1922), American baseball player
 Adrián Beltré (born 1979), Dominican Republic baseball player
 Adrian Brown (baseball) (born 1974), American baseball player
 Adrian Burnside (born 1977), Australian baseball player
 Adrian Cárdenas (born 1987), American baseball player
 Adrian Devine (1951–2020), American baseball player
 Adrian Garrett (1943–2021), American baseball player and coach
 Adrián González (born 1982), American-Mexican baseball player
 Adrian Houser (born 1993), American baseball player
 Addie Joss (1880–1911), American baseball pitcher
 Adrian Lynch (1897–1934), American baseball player
 Adrián Morejón (born 1999), Cuban baseball player
 Adrián Nieto (born 1989), Cuban baseball player
 Adrian Sampson (born 1991), American baseball player
 Adrián Sánchez (born 1990), Colombian-Venezuelan baseball player
 Adrián Zabala (1916–2002), Cuban baseball player

Basketball 
 Adrian Autry (born 1972), American basketball player
 Adrian Banks (born 1986), American basketball player
 Adrian Bauk (born 1985), Australian basketball player
 Adrian Branch (born 1963), American basketball player
 Adrian Caldwell (born 1966), American basketball player
 Adrian Celada, Filipino basketball player
 Adrian Dantley (born 1956), American basketball player
 Adrian Griffin (born 1974), American basketball player
 Adrian Pledger (born 1976), American basketball player
 Adrian Smith (basketball) (born 1936), American basketball player
 Adrian Tudor (born 1985), Romanian basketball player
 Adrian Williams-Strong (born 1977), American basketball player

Boxing 
 Adrian Blair (born 1943), Australian boxer
 Adrian Clark (boxer) (born 1986), American boxer
 Adrian Diaconu (born 1978), Romanian boxer
 Adrián Hernández (boxer) (born 1986), Mexican boxer
 Adrian Mora (born 1978), American boxer

Cricket 
 Adrian Aymes (born 1964), British cricketer
 Adrian Barath (born 1990), West Indian cricketer
 Adrian Birrell (born 1960), South African cricketer and coach
 Adrian Brown (cricketer) (born 1962), English cricketer
 Adrian Jones (cricketer) (born 1961), English cricketer
 Adrian Rollins (born 1972), English cricketer

Ice hockey 
 Adrian Aucoin (born 1973), Canadian ice hockey player
 Adrian Foster (ice hockey) (born 1982), Canadian ice hockey player
 Adrian Kempe (born 1996), Swedish ice hockey player
 Adrian Wichser (born 1980), Swiss ice hockey player

Racing 
 Adrian Adgar (born 1965), English cyclist
 Adrian Archibald (born 1969), British motorcycle racer
 Adrian Banaszek (born 1993), Polish cyclist
 Adrián Campos (1960-2021), Spanish racing driver
 Adrián Campos Jr. (born 1988), Spanish racing driver
 Adrian Carrio (born 1989), American racing driver
 Adrian "Wildman" Cenni, American off-road racing driver
 Adrián Fernández (born 1965), Mexican racing driver and team owner
 Adrián Fernández (motorcyclist) (born 2004), Spanish motorcycle racer
 Adrián González (cyclist) (born 1992), Spanish cyclist
 Adrian Kurek (born 1988), Polish road bicycle racer
 Adrián Martín (motorcyclist) (born 1992), Spanish motorcycle racer
 Adrian Newey (born 1958), British race car engineer and designer
 Adrian Quaife-Hobbs (born 1991), British racing driver
 Adrian Aas Stien (born 1992), Norwegian cyclist
 Adrian Sutil (born 1983), German racing driver
 Adrián Vallés (born 1986), Spanish race car driver
 Adrian Zaugg (born 1986), South African racing driver

Rugby 
 Adrian Apostol (born 1990), Romanian rugby player
 Adrian Barich (born 1963), Australian rules footballer and television and radio presenter
 Adrian Barone (born 1987), New Zealand rugby union footballer
 Adrian Bassett (born 1967), Australian rules footballer
 Adrian Battiston (born 1963), Australian rules footballer
 Adrian Beer (born 1943), Australian rules footballer
 Adrian Clarke (rugby union) (born 1938), New Zealand rugby player
 Adrian Davies (born 1969), English rugby player
 Adrian Davis (rugby league) (born 1990), Australian rugby player
 Adrian Garvey (born 1968), Zimbabwean-born South African rugby union player
 Adrian Lungu (born 1960), Romanian rugby player
 Adrian Morley (born 1977), English rugby player
 Adrian Pllotschi (born 1959), Romanian rugby player and coach
 Adrian Stoop (1883–1957), English rugby union player
 Adrian Young (footballer) (1943–2020), Australian rugby player

Swimming 
 Adrian Andermatt (born 1969), Swiss swimmer
 Adrian Moorhouse (born 1964), English swimmer
 Adrian O'Connor (born 1972), Irish backstroke swimmer
 Adrian Radley (born 1976), Australian swimmer
 Adrian Robinson (swimmer) (born 2000), Botswanan swimmer
 Adrian Romero (swimmer) (born 1972), Guamanian swimmer
 Adrian Turner (born 1977), British Olympic swimmer

Tennis 
 Adrian Andreev (born 2001), Bulgarian tennis player
 Adrian Bey (1938 – 2019), Rhodesian-born American professional tennis player
 Adrian Bodmer (born 1995), Swiss tennis player
 Adrian Bohane (born 1981), Irish-American former professional tennis player
 Adrian Cruciat (born 1983), Romanian tennis player
 Adrian Gavrilă (born 1984), Romanian tennis player
 Adrian Mannarino (born 1988), French tennis player
 Adrian Marcu (born 1961), professional tennis player from Romania
 Adrián Menéndez Maceiras (born 1985), Spanish tennis player
 Adrian Quist (1913–1991), Australian tennis player
 Adrian Ungur (born 1985), Romanian tennis player
 Adrian Voinea (born 1974), Romanian tennis player

Other 
 Adrian Adonis (1954–1988), American professional wrestler
 Adrian Alvarado (figure skater) (born 1983), Mexican figure skater
 Adrian Ang (born 1988), Malaysian bowler
 Adrián Annus (born 1973), Hungarian hammer thrower
 Adrian Bachmann (born 1976), Swiss sprint canoer
 Adrian Ballinger (born 1976), British-American climber, skier, and mountain guide
 Adrián Ben (born 1998)  Spanish middle-distance runner
 Adrian Berce (born 1958), Australian field hockey player
 Adrian Blincoe (born 1979), New Zealand runner
 Adrian Błocki (born 1990), Polish racewalker
 Adrian Breen (hurler) (born 1992), Irish hurler
 Adrian Cosma (1950–1996), Romanian handball player
 Adrian Crișan (born 1980), Romanian table tennis player
 Adrián Gavira (born 1987), Spanish beach volleyball player
 Adrian Gomes (born 1990), Brazilian gymnast
 Adrian Gray (born 1981), English darts player
 Adrian Gunnell (born 1972), English snooker player
 Adrian Hansen (born 1971), South African squash player
 Adrian Lewis (born 1985), English darts player
 Adrian Matei (born 1985), Romanian figure skater
 Adrian Metcalfe (1942–2021), British runner and sports broadcaster
 Adrian Neville (born 1986), English professional wrestler, known professionally as Pac
 Adrian Parker (born 1951), British modern pentathlete and Olympic champion
 Adrian Patrick (born 1973), English former sprinter
 Adrián Alonso Pereira (born 1988), Spanish futsal player
 Adrián Popa (born 1971), Hungarian weightlifter
 Adrian Rollinson (born 1965), British strongman
 Adrian Schultheiss (born 1988), Swedish figure skater
 Adrian Smith (strongman) (born 1964), British strongman
 Adrian Street (born 1940), Welsh wrestler and author
 Adrian Strzałkowski (born 1990), Polish long jumper
 Adrián Paz Velázquez (born 1964), Mexican Paralympic athlete
 Adrian Watt (born 1947), American ski jumper
 Adrian White (equestrian) (born 1933), New Zealand equestrian
 Adrian Alejandro Wittwer (born 1986), Swiss extreme athlete and ice swimmer
 Adrian Zieliński (born 1989), Polish weightlifter

Arts and entertainment
Adrian Adlam (born 1963), British violinist and conductor
Adrian Aeschbacher (1912–2002), Swiss classical pianist
Adrian Alandy (born 1980), Filipino actor and model
Adrian Allinson (1890–1959), British painter, potter and engraver
Adrián Alonso (born 1994), Mexican actor
Adrian Alphona, Canadian comic book artist
Adrian Alvarado (actor) (born 1976), American actor
Adrian Anantawan (born 1986), Canadian violinist
Adrian Augier, St. Lucian poet and producer
Adrian Bică Bădan (born 1988), Romanian footballer
Adrian Baker (born 1951), English singer, songwriter, and record producer
Adrian Bărar (1960–2021), Romanian guitarist and composer
Adrian Barber (1938–2020), English musician and producer
Adrian Batten (1591–1637), English organist
Adrian Bawtree (born 1968), English composer and organist
Adrian Beaumont (born 1937), British composer, conductor, and professor
Adrian Beers (1916–2004), British double bass player and teacher
Adrian Belew (born 1949), American guitarist, singer, songwriter, multi-instrumentalist and record producer
Adrian Benjamin (born 1942), actor and prebendary emeritus
Adrian Biddle (1952–2005), English cinematographer
Adrian Blevins (born 1964), American poet
Adrian Borland (1957–1999), English singer, songwriter, guitarist and record producer
Adrian Boult (1889–1983), English conductor
Adrian Brown (1929–2019), British director and poet
Adrian Brown (born 1949), British conductor
Adrian Brunel (1892–1958), English film director and screenwriter
Adrian Bustamante (born 1981), American actor
Adrián Caetano (born 1969), Uruguayan-Argentine film director, producer and screenplay writer
Adrian Carmack (born 1969), American video game artist
Adrián Carrio (born 1986), Spanish pianist
Adrian Chiles (born 1967), British television and radio presenter
Adrian Clarke (photographer), English photographer
Adrian Clarke (poet), British poet
Adrian Conan Doyle (1910–1970), English race-car driver, big-game hunter, explorer, and writer
Adrian Dingle (artist) (1911–1974), Welsh-Canadian painter and comic book artist
Adrian Dunbar (born 1958), Northern Ireland actor
Adrian Edmondson better known as Ade Edmondson (born 1957), English actor, comedian, director, writer and musician
Adrian Enescu (1948–2016), Romanian composer
Adrian Erlandsson (born 1970), Swedish heavy metal drummer
Adrian Fisher (musician) (1952-2000), former guitarist for Sparks (band)
Adrian Gaxha (born 1984), Macedonian singer-songwriter and producer
Adrian Ghenie (born 1977), Romanian painter
Adrian Gonzales (1937-1998), Filipino comic book artist
Adrián Luis González (born 1939), Mexican potter
Adrian Gray (born 1961), British artist
Adrian Adolph Greenburg (1903–1959), costume designer for over 250 films known as simply Adrian
Adrian Grenier (born 1976), American actor, producer, director, musician and environmentalist
Adrian Griffin (drummer), Australian drummer
Adrian Gurvitz (born 1949), English singer, musician and songwriter
Adrian Hall (actor) (born 1959), British actor and co-director
Adrian Hall (artist) (born 1943), British artist
Adrian Hall (director) (1927–2023), American theatre director
Adrian Hates (born 1973), German dark wave musician
Adrian Heath (1920–1992), British painter
Adrian Heathfield, British writer and curator
Adrian Hoven (1922–1981), Austrian actor, producer and film director
Adrian A. Husain (born 1945), Pakistani poet
Adrian Ivaniţchi (born 1947), Romanian folk musician and guitarist
Adrian Jones (sculptor) (1845–1938), English sculptor and painter who specialized in animals, particularly horses
Adrian Jones (born 1978), Swedish musician, member of Gjallarhorn
Adrian Karsten (1960–2005), American sports reporter
Adrian Kowanek (born 1977), Polish musician
Adrian Le Roy (1520–1598), French string player, composer, music publisher and educator
Adrian Leaper (born 1953), English conductor
Adrian Legg (born 1948), English guitar player
Adrian Lester (born 1968), British actor
Adrian Lucas (born 1962), English organist, tutor, and composer
Adrian Lulgjuraj (born 1980), Albanian rock singer
Adrian Lukis (born 1957), British actor
Adrian Lux (born 1986), Swedish disc jockey and music producer
Adrian Lyne (born 1941), English filmmaker and producer
Adrian Martin (born 1959), Australian film and arts critic
Adrian Martinez (actor) (born 1972), American actor and comedian
Adrian McKinty (writer) (born 1968), Northern Irish writer of crime and mystery novels
Adrian Minune (born 1974), Romani-Romanian manele singer
Adrian Mitchell (1932–2008), English poet, novelist and playwright
Adrian William Moore (born 1956), British philosopher and broadcaster
Adrián Navarro (born 1969), Argentine actor
Adrian Noble (born 1950), English theatre director
Adrian Pasdar (born 1965), American actor and film director
Adrian Paul (born 1959), English actor
Adrian Pecknold (1920–1999), Canadian mime, director, and author
Adrian Petriw (born 1987), Canadian actor
Adrian Picardi (born 1987), American filmmaker
Adrian Pintea (1954–2007), Romanian actor
Adrian Piotrovsky (1898–1937), Russian dramaturge
Adrian Piper (born 1948), American conceptual artist and philosophy professor
Adrian Pisarello (born 1970), Gibraltarian musician and songwriter
Adrian R'Mante (born 1978), American television actor
Adrian Rawlins (born 1958), English actor
Adrian Ludwig Richter (1803–1884), German painter and etcher
Adrian Rodriguez (DJ), German DJ
Adrián Rodríguez (born 1988), Spanish actor and singer from Catalonia
Adrian Rodriguez, American bass guitarist for The Airborne Toxic Event
Adrian Rollini (1903–1956), American multi-instrumentalist best known for his jazz music
Adrian Ross (1859–1933), British lyricist
Adrián Rubio, Mexican actor and model
Adrian Scarborough (born 1968), English character actor
Adrian Scott (1912–1972), American screenwriter and film producer
Adrian Shaposhnikov (1888–1967), Russian classical composer 
Adrian Sherwood (born 1958), English record producer
Adrian Sînă (born 1977), Romanian singer-songwriter and record producer
Adrian D. Smith (born 1944), American architect
Adrian Smith (born 1957), English musician and one of three guitarists/songwriters in the English band Iron Maiden
Adrian Smith (illustrator), British illustrator
Adrian Steirn, photographer and filmmaker
Adrian Consett Stephen (1894–1918), Australian artillery officer and playwright
Adrian Stokes (critic) (1902–1972), British art critic
Adrian Scott Stokes (1854–1935), English landscape painter
Adrian Stroe (born 1959), Romanian serial killer
Adrian Sturges (born 1976), British film producer
Adrián Suar (born 1968), Argentine actor and media producer
Adrian Tanner, English writer and director
Adrian Taylor (producer) (1954–2014), American television news producer
Adrian Tchaikovsky (born 1972), British fantasy and science fiction author
Adrián Terrazas-González (born 1975), Mexican jazz composer and wind player
Adrian Thaws (born 1968), English musician and actor
Adrian Tomine (born 1974), American cartoonist
Adrian Truss (born 1953), British-Canadian actor
Adrian Utley (born 1957), English musician best known as a member of the band Portishead
Adrian Vandenberg (born 1954), Dutch rock guitarist
Adrian Wells (born 1989), British-American clinical psychologist, singer and songwriter
Adrian White (musician), Canadian drummer
Adrian White (author), Anglo-Irish writer
Adrian Willaert (c. 1490–1562), Flemish composer of the Renaissance and founder of the Venetian School
Adrian Wilson (actor) (born 1969), South African model and actor
Adrian Wilson (artist) (born 1964), British artist and photographer
Adrian Wong (born 1990), Hong Kong actress
Adrian Wright (1947–2015), English-Australian actor
Adrian Young (born 1969), American drummer for the rock band No Doubt
Adrian Younge (born 1978), American composer, arranger, and music producer
Adrian Zagoritis (born 1968), British songwriter and record producer
Adrian Zingg (1734–1816), Swiss painter
Adrian Zmed (born 1954), American television personality and film actor

Other
Adrian Arendt (born 1952), Romanian sailor
Adrian Bancker (1703–1772), American silversmith
Adrian Beecroft (born 1947), British venture capitalist
Adrian Bell (1901–1980), English ruralist journalist, crossword compiler, and farmer
Adrian Bellamy (born 1941/1942), British businessman
Adrian Block (1567–1627), Dutch explorer of the American East Coast
Adrian Brown (archivist) (born 1969), British archivist
Adrian Brown (journalist), Australian journalist
Adrian Cheng (born 1979), Hong Kong entrepreneur and business executive
Adrian Cioroianu (born 1967), Romanian historian, politician, journalist, and essayist
Adrian Cronauer (1938–2018), American former lawyer and radio speaker
Adrian Diel (1756–1839), German physician
Adrian Finighan (born 1964), British journalist
Adrian Frutiger (1928–2015), Swiss typeface designer
Adrian Fulford (born 1953), British judge
Adrian Geiges (born 1960), German writer and journalist
Adrian Anthony Gill (1954–2016), British writer and critic
Adrian Gonzalez (kidnapper) (born 2000), American kidnapper
Adrián Gómez González, Mexican drug lord
Adrián Arroyo Gutiérrez (born 1976), Costa Rican serial killer and rapist, known as The Southern Psychopath
Adrian Hanauer (born 1966), American businessman and minority owner and general manager of the Seattle Sounders FC
Adrian Hayes (adventurer) (born 1959), British explorer
Adrian Holovaty (born 1981), American web developer, journalist and entrepreneur
Adrian van Hooydonk (born 1964), Dutch automobile designer
Adrian Albert Jurgens (1886–1953), South African philatelist
Adrian Kantrowitz (1918–2008), American cardiac surgeon
Adrian Kashchenko (1858–1921), Ukrainian writer, historian of the Zaporozhian Cossacks
Adrian Knox (1863–1932), Australian judge
Adrian Künzi (born 1973), Swiss banker 
Adrian Lamo (born 1981), Colombian-American threat analyst and "grey hat" hacker
Adrian Lim (1942–1988), Singaporean serial killer
Adrian Long, British civil engineer
 Adrian Mikhalchishin (born 1954), Ukrainian chess grandmaster
Adrian von Mynsicht (1603–1638), German alchemist
Adrian Parr (born 1967), Australian philosopher and cultural critic
Adrian Păunescu (1943–2010), Romanian poet, journalist, and politician
Adrian Plass (born 1948), English author and speaker
Adrian Rogers (1931–2005), American pastor, conservative and author
Adrian Andrei Rusu (born 1951), Romanian medieval archaeologist
Adrian Anthony Spears (1910–1991), American judge
Adrián Steckel, Mexican businessman
Adrian Stephen (1883–1948), British author and psychoanalyst, brother of Virginia Woolf and Vanessa Bell
Adrian Stroe (born 1959), Romanian serial killer
 Adrian Swire (1932 – 2018), billionaire British heir and businessman
Adrian Ursu (born 1968), Romanian journalist
Adrian Weale (born 1964), English writer, journalist, illustrator and photographer
Adrian Wewer (1836–1914), German-born American architect and Franciscan friar
Adrian White (businessman) (born 1942), British businessman, founder of Biwater
Adrian Zecha (born 1933), Indonesian hotelier

Fictional characters 
Adrien Agreste, a superhero and male protagonist of Miraculous: Tales of Ladybug & Cat Noir
Adrian Chase, DC Comics superhero
Adrian Corbo, alias Flex, a Marvel Comics superhero
Adrian "Fletch" Fletcher, character on the British medical dramas Casualty and Holby City
Adrian Hall, character on the soap opera Home and Away
Adrian Ivashkov, character in Richelle Mead's Vampire Academy and protagonist in Bloodlines
Adrian Leverkühn, protagonist of Thomas Mann's Doctor Faustus
Adrian Mole, protagonist of The Secret Diary of Adrian Mole
Adrian Monk, protagonist of the television series Monk
Adrian Pennino, wife of Rocky Balboa
Adrian Seidelman, character from the Cybersix comic and television series
Adrian Shephard, protagonist of the Half-Life expansion "Half-Life: Opposing Force"
Adrian Fahrenheit Ţepeş, alias Alucard, character in the Castlevania video games
Adrian Toomes, alias Vulture, a Marvel Comics villain
Adrian Veidt, alias Ozymandias, character in the Watchmen graphic novel series
Adrian Woodhouse, spawn of Satan in the film Rosemary's Baby
 Adrian, a character in Shakespeare's Coriolanus, is a Volscian who is oddly friendly with a Roman named Nicanor, and acts as a spy for the state.
 Adrian, a mental woman in The Crush (1993 film)

See also
Adreian

References

Sources

English masculine given names
German masculine given names
Dutch masculine given names
Norwegian masculine given names
Swedish masculine given names
Danish masculine given names
Icelandic masculine given names
Romanian masculine given names
Spanish masculine given names